The Living Tree is an album by Jon Anderson and Rick Wakeman (as Anderson/Wakeman), both previously members of progressive rock band Yes. The album was initially sold only as a souvenir during their UK tour in Autumn 2010, titled "The Anderson Wakeman Project 360" and from the Gonzo Multimedia online store. It was made available to the public on 29 November 2010.

Overview
The album was announced as going to be containing re-workings of classic Yes songs and at least 9 new songs, four of which were featured on the previous (inaugural) Anderson/Wakeman tour in 2006. but the ultimate release only contained 9 new tracks.

Recording for the album began in August 2010. Wakeman stated that he would record the backing tracks at his studio in England and that these would be sent to Anderson in the US to record his vocals. These tracks were all then to be sent back to Wakeman for mixing and mastering.

Tracks

All tracks lyrics by Anderson, music by Wakeman, except "Just One Man" (lyrics: Anderson; music: Jeremy Cubert; music performed by Wakeman). Produced by Anderson/Wakeman/Erik Jordan.

Personnel
Jon Anderson – vocals, guitars
Rick Wakeman – piano, keyboards, synthesizers
Erik Jordan – engineer

References

External links
Official Rick Wakeman Website
Official Jon Anderson Website
Jon Anderson's Official Facebook Page
Official Yes Website

Jon Anderson albums
Rick Wakeman albums
2010 albums
Progressive rock albums by British artists